Sport was a Serbian daily sports newspaper. The first edition was published on 5 May 1945 under the name Fiskultura and the last edition went out on 17 September 2016. Since the mid-2000s it was billed as "Dnevni sportski list" (daily sporting newspaper), while previously it used to be known as "Jugoslovenski sportski list" (Yugoslav sporting newspaper).

Editions were written in Serbian Cyrillic, at 24 to 32 pages, publishing news, results, reports, interviews from Serbia and the rest of the world, following more than 60 sports.

Golden Badge - Zlatna značka
Since 1957, Sport had given out the Golden Badge ( / ) award for the best athlete in Yugoslavia, now Serbia. In addition, Sport selected the best young athletes, the most beautiful sportswoman and sportsman, and the fair play trophy.

Multiple winners

By sports

See also
Awards of Olympic Committee of Serbia

References

Defunct newspapers published in Serbia
Newspapers published in Yugoslavia
Sports mass media in Serbia
Sports newspapers
Sport in Serbia
Publications with year of establishment missing
Serb
Serbian awards
Lists of sportspeople
Lists of award winners
1945 establishments in Serbia
Newspapers established in 1945
2016 disestablishments in Serbia
Publications disestablished in 2016